"Shine" is a 1991 single by the British pop group Five Star.

Shine was their third consecutive single with Epic Record, UK No.88, UK Dance (Music Week) No.53, the group performed the track on Sky TV and did some promotional work for the single and album in the UK .   

Five Star were then dropped by the company and would not release another single for the next four years.

Track listings
7" Single and cassette single:

1. Shine

2. Feelings

12" Single:

1. Shine (New Jack Mix)   4:32

2. Shine (New Jack Mix featuring Def Jef)  4:31

3. Shine (Slick-Hop/Boom Mix)  4:30

4. Shine (Glamour Mix featuring Def Jef)  6:07

CD Single:

1. Shine  4:45   (album version)

2. Feelings  4:28

3. Shine (New Jack Mix)   4:31

4. Shine (The Glamour Mix)   5:31 

UK Catalogue Number: Epic EPC657480

US promo CD Single:  ESK 4335

1. Shine (LP edit) 4:00

2. Shine (New Jack Mix Edit) 4:00

Five Star songs
1991 singles